Regional elections were held in Scotland on Tuesday 2 May 1978, as part of the Local Government (Scotland) Act 1973.  They saw a resurgence of support for the Labour Party, retaining control of Strathclyde and Fife and winning Central and Lothian.

National results

|-
!colspan=2|Parties
!Votes
!Votes %
!Wards
|-
| 
|592,616
|39.6
|176
|-
| 
|453,003
|30.3
|136
|-
| 
|313,062
|20.9
|18
|-
| 
|34,284
|2.3
|6
|-
| 
|7,884
|0.5
|1
|-
| 
|6,629
|0.4
|0
|-
|
|Independent Ratepayer
|5,754
|0.4
|1
|-
| 
|4,841
|0.3
|1
|-
|
|Independent Nationalist
|2,447
|0.2
|2
|-
| 
|1,291
|0.1
|0
|-
| 
|168
|0.01
|0
|-
| style="width: 10px" bgcolor=|
| style="text-align: left;" scope="row" | Independent
|73,449
|4.9
|89
|-
!colspan=2|Total!! 1,495,428 !! 100.0 !! 431
|}

Results by council area

References

 
Ele
1978
May 1978 events in the United Kingdom